During the 1960s a new series of 'sound effect' comedies began with Dick Lester, Spike Milligan and Peter Sellers's Running Jumping & Standing Still, continued through Eric Sykes's The Plank, Barbara Windsor's San Ferry Ann and included four films with Ronnie Barker: A Home of Your Own, Futtock's End, The Picnic, and By the Sea.

The tradition went on through Benny Hill and continued with Mr. Bean.

Comedy genres